Shin Goo (born Shin Soon-ki, ; August 13, 1936) is a South Korean film, theater, and television actor. Shin began his career on stage in 1962, in the play "Cow", and has appeared in numerous works of Korean theatre, film and television. In 2010 Shin, was awarded the 2011 Bogwan Order of Cultural Merit (South Korea) by the government. In 2022, Shin received special award from Lee Hae-rang Theater Award, one of the major theater awards in Korea.

Early life and education 
Shin Goo was born on August 13, 1936. Shin Gu was a graduate of Gyonggi Middle School and Gyeonggi High School. He then admitted to the Department of Korean Literature at Sungkyunkwan University. He initially wanted to attend Department of Commerce at Seoul National University, but was discoured after failing the test twice. by the continuous failure.

After serving in the army, Shin went to an announcer's academy. He saw a small commercial in the corner of the newspaper by chance. In an interview with Kyunghyang Shinmun in 2013, Shin Gu said, "It was an advertisement to recruit first-term students at the Namsan Drama Center Actor Academy. I thought this was it," he said, explaining why he started acting. In autumn 1962, Shin decided to enter newly established Namsan Drama Center Actor Academy, founded by Dongrang  (1905-1974) which was predecessor of today Department of Theater and Film of Seoul Institute of the Arts. Class of 1962 was the first batch from the academy, and Shin's fellow classmate included Jeon Moo-song, Lee Ho-jae, Ban Hyo-jeong (who did not graduate), and playwright Yoon Dae-seong.

Career

Early theater career 

He debut onstage in 1962 in Yoo Chi-jin's play "So," with the role of a grumpy father. Instead of his real name, Shin Soon-ki, Shin acted under the stage name Shin-gu. His stage name was given to him by playwright  when he was a first-year student at the Namsan Drama Center's Theater Academy. Shin said, "It seems that he gave me a long term gu (久) to be an actor without thinking about anything else. I feel joy when I stand on stage as a 'completely different me'."Shin decission to pursue acting was not supported by his family. Shin began to be recognized as an actor after winning three awards for male acting at the most prestigious Dong-A Theater Awards. Shin won the 3rd Dong-A Theater Award for Best Male Actor in 1966 for his role as chairman of the People's Committee in the play I Will Become a Human and for his role as crown in "Given Up and Beth." He then won the 6th Dong-A Theater Award for Best Male Actor in 1969 through his role as Stanley in Tennesse William's play A Streetcar Named Desire. Shin cited the play as his most memorable work in interview with Kyunghyang Shin-mun. "Mr. Yoo Chi-jin made me study at the East West Cultural Center of the University of Hawaii for a year, and I did it right after I returned home," he recalled. Shin never stopped after winning two acting awards. Shin got his third best male actor at the 8th Dong-A Theater Awards in 1971 for role Harry in the play Luv.

In early 1970s, Shin joined National Theater Company of Korea (NTCK). His most memorable and notable works there were playwright  play 'Active Volcano' in 1974 and 'Jingbirok' in 1975.

Venture to screen 
Shin Gu was selected as a special recruit for the Seoul Central Broadcasting System (currently KBS) in 1969. He was recommended by actor Park In-hwan. Shin made his debut on the screen in 1972 with the drama "Heosaengjeon," and has since appeared in countless works such as the dramas "Water Pattern," "Hope," "Country," "Land," "A Day About Us," and "King and Rain."

Shin devoted himself to acting while busily working between the theater stage and television. In addition, Shin Gu was nicknamed the "national father" due to his acting as father in dramas School 1, Tomato, and Can't stop them if possible.

Shin won the best acting award in the play category for the play "Feel Like Heaven" at the 35th Baeksang Arts Awards in 1999.

Even though Shin acted in film since 1970s, It was only after the 1990s that Shin has notable works. In 1992 Our Twisted Hero, he played Teacher Choi, a fifth-grade homeroom teacher dominated by Eom Seok-dae. It was originally written by Lee Moon-yeol and directed by Park Jong-won. Shin also acted in director Hur Jin-ho's debut film and a monumental work of Korean melodrama, Christmas in August. He acted as a father with hearing loss and his son Jung Won, acted by Han Seok-kyu, was dying of an incurable disease. In "The Big Family Who Went Away" (2005), he played the role of a displaced father who left his family in North Korea.

Famous tagline 
From 1999 to 2009, Shin played Chief Judge in KBS show The Clinic for Married Couples: Love and War. This was a milestone project for him, his closing remark, "See you in four weeks," became extemely popular. In 2005, Shin won Achievement Award from KBS Entertaintment Awards. In 2002, Shin appeared in a hamburger commercial lying on a boatwith snow crabs. The advertisement's concept was a parody of Hemingway's novel The Old Man and the Sea. Shin's tagline "You know the taste of crabs," became extremely popular. Everytime South Korean see see snow crabs on the table, It reminds them of Shin's tagline.

Variety show 
In 2013, cable channel tvN launched the travel-reality show Grandpas Over Flowers (the title parodies the manga Boys Over Flowers). It marked producer Na Young-seok's first variety show since leaving KBS, where he was best known for creating the first season of hit variety show 2 Days & 1 Night. Defying a youth-centered entertainment industry, the hit show stars four veteran actors in their 70s, Lee Soon-jae, Park Geun-hyung and Baek Il-seob, with their porter Lee Seo-jin as they go on a backpacking tour of France, Taiwan and Spain.

The first season aired from July 5 to August 16, 2013 with seven episodes. It was filmed in Paris, Strasbourg, Bern, and Lucerne. It was immediately followed by the airing of the second season from August 23 to September 20, 2013. The five episodes were filmed in Taiwan, with an additional two-episode special featuring unaired footage on September 27 and October 4, 2013. The third season aired from March 7 to May 2, 2014 with eight episodes. It was filmed in Spain, specifically the cities of Barcelona, Granada, Seville, Ronda, and Madrid. Shin Goo also went on a solo trip to Lisbon. The fourth season aired from March 27 to May 8, 2015 with seven episodes. It was filmed in Dubai and Greece, with Choi Ji-woo joining as a second travel guide and assistant.

In 2017, Na Young-seok decided to introduce a new program which focuses on a group of South Korean celebrities operating a small Korean cuisine restaurant on a small island overseas. Shin starred in Season 1 alongside Youn Yuh-jung, Lee Seo-jin, Park Seo-joon and Jung Yu-mi. Season 1 was filmed in Lombok, Indonesia.

After a few years' break, a fifth season titled Grandpa Over Flowers Returns aired from June 29 to August 24, 2018 with nine episodes. Actor Kim Yong-gun joined the cast for the trip filmed in Germany, Czech Republic and Austria.

Personal life 
In 1974, Shin was married to Ha Jung-sook. Their wedding was officiated by playwright .

Filmography

Film

Television series

Variety show

Theater

Awards and nominations

State honors

Notes

References

External links
 Shin Goo Fan Cafe at Daum 
 
 
 

1936 births
Living people
20th-century South Korean male actors
21st-century South Korean male actors
South Korean male film actors
South Korean male television actors
South Korean male stage actors
Male actors from Seoul
Seoul Institute of the Arts alumni
Best Actor Paeksang Arts Award (theatre) winners
Sin clan of Pyongsan